Eddie Andrews is an American businessman and politician serving as a  member of the Iowa House of Representatives for the 43rd district. Elected in November 2020, he assumed office in 2021.

Personal life 
Andrews is from Johnston, Iowa and attended the University of Iowa where he obtained an undergraduate degree. Andrews is an entrepreneur working in tech.

Iowa House of Representatives 
Eddie Andrews was elected to the Iowa House November 3, 2021, defeating incumbent Democrat Karin Derry. As a member of the Iowa House of Representatives, Andrews sits on the House Commerce Committee, Public Safety Committee, and the House Veterans Affairs Committee. Additionally, he serves as the Vice Chair for the Subcommittee on Health and Human Services Appropriations.

2020 Election 
While running in the 2020 election, Andrews highlighted "family safety, education, low taxes and creation of entrepreneur zones to help mom and pop small businesses", but also stressed that mental health issues would be his top priority.

2021 Session 
Andrews ran legislation that would ban spousal-consent requirements for women who are seeking a hysterectomy. On issues of policing,  Andrews initially joined democrats in voting against the "Back the Blue" bill, which created protections for police officers and punishments for protest-related offenses. He later joined republicans in voting for the bill after the legislation returned from the Senate and was amended. Andrews also pushed a parental rights bill, which would codify parental rights and protections for those rights. The legislation passed the House unanimously, but did not receive a vote in the Senate.

References 

Republican Party members of the Iowa House of Representatives
University of Iowa alumni
People from Johnston, Iowa
21st-century American politicians
Year of birth missing (living people)
Living people
African-American state legislators in Iowa